Marcus Aurelius Carinus (died 285) was Roman emperor from 283 to 285. The elder son of emperor Carus, he was first appointed Caesar and in the beginning of 283, with the title of Augustus, he was appointed co-emperor of the western portion of the empire by his father. Official accounts of his character and career, which portray him as debauched and incapable, have been filtered through the propaganda of his successful opponent, Diocletian.

Reign
After the death of Emperor Probus in a spontaneous mutiny of the army in 282, his praetorian prefect, Carus, ascended to the throne. The latter, upon his departure for the Persian war, elevated his two sons to the title of Caesar. Carinus, the elder, was left to handle the affairs of the west in his absence and was later elevated to the rank of Augustus, while the younger, Numerian, accompanied his father to the east.

Carinus at least initially acquitted himself ably of his commission, displaying some merit in the suppression of disturbances in Gaul and against the Quadi, but the young emperor soon left the defence of the Upper Rhine to his legates and returned to Rome, where the surviving accounts, which demonize him, assert that he abandoned himself to all kinds of profligacy and excess. Reportedly, he managed to wed and divorce nine separate women during his short rule in Rome, and made the infamy of his private life notorious. He is supposed to have initiated persecution against many whom he considered to have treated him with insufficient respect before his elevation; to have alienated the Senate by his open aversion and contempt; and to have prostituted the imperial dignity with the various low entertainments which he introduced into the court.

Carus, when he heard of his son's deportment in the capital, declared his intention of degrading him from his station, and substituting Constantius Chlorus, then already marked for ability and virtue, in his place. However, Carus died soon thereafter in the middle of the Persian war, and his two sons jointly succeeded him.

Carinus back in Rome in the aftermath of his accession organized the celebration of the annual games, the Ludi Romani, on a scale of unexampled magnificence.  At the same time  Numerian was forced by the soldiers to abandon their father's ambitious campaign in the east, due to their superstitions at Carus' death, which occurred allegedly by a bolt of lightning.

Numerian headed with his army for Rome, where a triumph was awaiting him, leaving the Persians astonished by the inexplicable retirement of a victorious army. However, Numerian's health was broken by the climate, and being unable to bear the heat of the sun, was borne on the march in a covered litter. Arrius Aper, the praetorian prefect, assumed the conduct of affairs in his name, but his ambitious temper excited the suspicion of the troops. At Heraclea in Thrace they broke into the Imperial tent, and Numerian was found dead. Diocletian, commander of the body-guards, affirmed that Numerian had been assassinated by the praefect, and after executing the latter he was proclaimed emperor by the soldiers.

Carinus left Rome at once and set out for the east to meet Diocletian. On his way through Pannonia he put down the usurper Sabinus Julianus and in July 285 he encountered the army of Diocletian at the Battle of the Margus River (the modern Morava River) in Moesia.

Death in 285 

Historians differ on what then ensued. At the Battle of the Margus, according to one account, the valour of his troops had gained the day, but Carinus was assassinated by a tribune whose wife he had seduced. Another account represents the battle as resulting in a complete victory for Diocletian, and claims that Carinus' army deserted him. This account may be confirmed by the fact that Diocletian kept in service Carinus' Praetorian Guard commander, Titus Claudius Aurelius Aristobulus.

Character 
Carinus has a reputation as one of the worst Roman emperors. This infamy may have been supported by Diocletian. The unreliable Historia Augusta has Carinus marrying nine wives. After his death, Carinus' memory was officially condemned in the Roman proceeding known as damnatio memoriae. His name, along with that of his wife, was erased from inscriptions.

Family tree

References

Primary sources
 Anonymous, Epitome de Caesaribus
 Aurelius Victor
 Eutropius, Breviarium ab urbe condita
 Historia Augusta, Life of Carus, Carinus and Numerian
 Joannes Zonaras, Compendium of History extract: Zonaras: Alexander Severus to Diocletian: 222–284

Secondary sources

In literature
 Mor Jokai's A Christian but a Roman is set in Carinus' Rome

External links 

285 deaths
3rd-century murdered monarchs
3rd-century Roman emperors
Imperial Roman consuls
Crisis of the Third Century
Murdered Roman emperors
Aurelii
3rd-century births
Year of birth unknown
Roman emperors to suffer posthumous denigration or damnatio memoriae
Sons of Roman emperors
Caran dynasty